Bucculatrix laciniatella is a moth in the family Bucculatricidae. It was described by Per Benander in 1931. It is found from Sweden and the southern part of European Russia to Japan (Honshu).

The wingspan is 6–8 mm. Adults are on wing from May to July.

The larvae feed on Artemisia oelandica and Artemisia laciniata. They mine the leaves of their host plant. Larvae can be found in May.

References

Natural History Museum Lepidoptera generic names catalog

Bucculatricidae
Moths described in 1931
Moths of Europe
Moths of Asia
Leaf miners